The National Health Insurance Authority is an agency of the government of the Bahamas,  established under the National Health Insurance Act 2003. 

It is intended to secure the implementation of a national health insurance policy that ensures access to basic healthcare services to all residents.

In 2018 it proposed a very substantial extension to the existing National Health Insurance program , and associated increases in taxation.

References

Medical and health organisations based in the Bahamas
Health insurance